David Quinn Olsen (born February 5, 1996) is an American soccer player who currently plays for USL League One club Richmond Kickers.

Career

Youth, College and Amateur
Olsen spent with youth career with the Crossfire Premier Academy and the Seattle Sounders FC Academy before signing a letter of intent to play college soccer at San Diego State University.  In 2014, he made 19 appearances for the Aztecs and tallied seven goals and 1 assists.

On March 30, 2015, it was announced that Olsen had decided to transfer to Seattle University.  He made a total of 30 appearances for the Redhawks and tallied 20 goals and five assists.

He also played in the Premier Development League for Seattle Sounders FC U-23.

Professional
On March 24, 2017, Olsen signed a professional contract with USL club Seattle Sounders FC 2.  He made his professional debut two days later in a 2–1 defeat to Sacramento Republic.

Following a break from the professional game due to injury, Olsen returned to playing with USL League One club Richmond Kickers announcing he'd joined ahead of their 2022 season.

References

External links
Seattle U bio
U.S. Soccer Development Academy bio

1996 births
Living people
All-American men's college soccer players
American soccer players
Association football forwards
People from Auburn, Washington
Richmond Kickers players
San Diego State Aztecs men's soccer players
Seattle Redhawks men's soccer players
Seattle Sounders FC U-23 players
Soccer players from Washington (state)
Sportspeople from King County, Washington
Tacoma Defiance players
USL Championship players
USL League Two players